"Five-O" is the first single by Elephant Man from his album Let's Get Physical. In addition, it's also his debut single released with Bad Boy Records. It features Wyclef Jean and has a small vocal in the intro by Diddy.

The official remix features Wyclef Jean, Swizz Beatz, Assassin, and Yung Joc. In the remix Swizz adds some of his production.

This song is featured on DANCE! Online, a multiplayer online casual rhythm game.

Music video
The music video is directed by Gil Green and recorded in Little Haiti, Miami. The video uses a theme similar to "COPS" but it's named "Five-O". Two police officers suspect an illegal activity by two suspects, which they target Elephant Man and Wyclef. At first, they're being followed and pulled over. The policemen conduct a search on the vehicle and find a "possible concealed weapon" and try to arrest the suspects. However, they resist arrest and attempt to escape the policemen. The video shows a cameo of Reggaeton artist Tego Calderón.

Charts

References

2007 singles
Reggae fusion songs
Bad Boy Records singles
Music videos directed by Gil Green
Elephant Man (musician) songs
Wyclef Jean songs
2007 songs
Songs written by Jerry Duplessis
Songs written by Wyclef Jean